Gregorio Camacho (1933–2002) was a Venezuelan painter.

1933 births
2002 deaths
People from Barquisimeto
20th-century Venezuelan painters
20th-century Venezuelan male artists
Male painters